The 1911 Five Nations Championship was the second series of the rugby union Five Nations Championship following the inclusion of France into the Home Nations Championship. Including the previous Home Nations Championships, this was the twenty-ninth series of the annual northern hemisphere rugby union championship. Ten matches were played between 2 January and 25 March. It was contested by England, France, Ireland, Scotland and Wales.

Wales won the championship for the seventh time outright. In beating the other four countries they completed the Grand Slam for the third time in four seasons and the Triple Crown for a seventh time.

Table

Results

External links

Six Nations Championship seasons
FIve Nations
Five Nations
Five Nations
Five Nations
Five Nations
Five Nations
Five Nations Championship
Five Nations Championship
Five Nations Championship